Valmir Seferi (born 18 February 1993) is a Finnish football player currently playing for Finnish Kakkonen side Lohjan Pallo.

References

  Profile at veikkausliiga.com

External links
 Valmir Seferi at FC Honka 
 

1993 births
Living people
Finnish footballers
FC Honka players
Veikkausliiga players
FC Viikingit players
Finnish people of Albanian descent
Pallohonka players
Association football midfielders
People from Karkkila
Sportspeople from Uusimaa